Yeldersley is a civil parish in the Derbyshire Dales district of Derbyshire, England.  The parish contains 14 listed buildings that are recorded in the National Heritage List for England.  All the listed buildings are designated at Grade II, the lowest of the three grades, which is applied to "buildings of national importance and special interest".  The parish is almost entirely rural, with no substantial settlements, and the listed buildings consist of houses, cottages and associated structures, farmhouses and farm buildings, and a milepost.


Buildings

References

Citations

Sources

 

Lists of listed buildings in Derbyshire